Dr. Willis Alfred Adcock (November 25, 1922 – December 16, 2003) was a Canadian-American physical chemist, electrical engineer, and university professor who worked on the first atomic bomb and assisted with the invention of the silicon transistor, as well as the integrated circuit. He held several US patents.

Early life
Adcock was born in Saint-Jean-sur-Richelieu, Quebec, Canada on November 25, 1922. He went to grade school in Clarenceville, Quebec. In 1936 he went to live with his uncle in nearby Champlain, New York to attend high school, as Clarenceville did not have a high school at the time.

Under the mentorship of the Champlain High School principal, a Hobart alumnus, he attended Hobart College where he obtained a B.S. in Math and Chemistry in 1944. After graduating Adcock joined the US Army where he became a technical staff member in the
Clinton Laboratories in Oak Ridge, Tennessee. While in the Army, he applied for and received United States citizenship and he was a member of the team that developed the atomic bomb. He left the Army in 1948 to pursue his PhD in Physical Chemistry at Brown University.

Work
He had a brief stint as a technical staff member for Stanolind Oil and Gas Company in Tulsa, Oklahoma, later known as Pan American Oil Co., later still a part of Amoco, before becoming manager of development at the Integrated Circuits Department at Texas Instruments, in Dallas, Texas. At Texas Instruments, he grew silicon boules for construction of the first silicon transistor,  he later assisted with the development of the first silicon integrated circuits built at TI. Adcock later became the first TI Principal Fellow.

He left Texas Instruments for a year in 1964 to work as technical director for Sperry Semiconductor in
Norwalk, Connecticut, but returned to TI in 1965 as manager of advanced planning and technical development. He was later assistant vice president and finally vice president of corporate staff from 1982 until his retirement from TI in 1986.

After retiring from TI, Adcock moved to Austin, Texas and became a professor of electrical and computer engineering at the University of Texas at Austin where he contributed articles to professional journals and developed a novel SEMATECH Research Center of Excellence at the University. Adcock was a fellow of the I.E.E.E. and
A.A.A.S., and was a member of the National Academy of Engineering, the American Chemical Society and Sigma XI. He was a Phi Beta Kappa Principal Fellow of the Texas Institute. Adcock was awarded an honorary degree from Hobart College in 1989. He also provided oral commentary for an Electronic Watch exhibit at the Smithsonian Institution.

Adcock was awarded patents for the first electronic photography system (originally filed in 1972, patents 4057830 and 4163256 were awarded in 1976 and 1977).  Adcock most recently received a government patent for his Gyroscopic Torque Converter in
2003.

Personal life
Adcock married his college sweetheart, Eleanor Goller (William Smith College class of 1944). They had four
children before Eleanor died in 1970.  He was remarried to Sara McCoy Whiddon.  Adcock died on December 16, 2003 in Austin, Texas.

See also

List of University of Texas at Austin people
List of Brown University people
List of Southern Methodist University people

References

External links
 Oral history interview with Jack S. Kilby at Charles Babbage Institute, University of Minnesota, Minneapolis.  Interview covers Jack Kilby's entire career, including his education, work experiences at Centralab, where he worked with Alfred Khouri and Robert Wolff, and at Texas Instruments (TI) under Willis Adcock.  Kilby discusses TI's development and manufacturing of integrated circuits. He discusses his involvement in the development of the first hand-held calculator at TI. Discusses semiconductor developments at Fairchild Corporation and his independent work after leaving TI in 1970.

1922 births
2003 deaths
20th-century Canadian scientists
American physical chemists
Anglophone Quebec people
Brown University alumni
Canadian physical chemists
Canadian emigrants to the United States
Hobart and William Smith Colleges alumni
People from Saint-Jean-sur-Richelieu
Texas Instruments people
University of Texas at Austin faculty
Scientists from Quebec
Engineers from Quebec
20th-century Canadian engineers
United States Army personnel of World War II